Svitene Parish is an administrative unit of Bauska Municipality in the Semigallia region of Latvia.

Towns, villages and settlements of Svitene Parish 
  - parish administrative center

References 

Parishes of Latvia
Bauska Municipality
Semigallia